Juliana of Lazarevo (or Juliana of Murom) (1530 – 10 January 1604) is a saint of the Eastern Orthodox Church. She was born in Moscow, to Justin and Stefanida Nedyurev, and married Giorgi Osorgin, owner of the village of Lazarevo, near Murom. She lived a righteous life, consecrating herself to helping poor and needy people.

Her life is considered as an example of a layman living in the world, as anyone may be supposed to please God not only by withdrawing from the world to a monastic cell, but within a family, amid cares for children, spouse, and members of the household.

The saint day of Saint Juliana of Lazarevo is celebrated by Orthodox Church on 2 January New Style and 15 January Old Style.

A descendant of hers, Juliana Ossorguine, was the mother of Serge Schmemann.

There is a parish of the Western-American Diocese of the Russian Orthodox Church Outside of Russia named "St. Juliana of Lazarevo Orthodox Church".

See also
Eastern Orthodoxy
Russian Orthodox Church

References

1530 births
1604 deaths
Russian saints of the Eastern Orthodox Church
16th-century Russian people
17th-century Russian people
16th-century Christian saints
17th-century Christian saints
Christian female saints of the Early Modern era
16th-century Russian women
17th-century Russian women